Kowloon is an urban area in Hong Kong comprising the Kowloon Peninsula and New Kowloon.

Location
Kowloon is located directly north of Hong Kong Island across Victoria Harbour. It is bordered by the Lei Yue Mun strait to the east, Mei Foo Sun Chuen, Butterfly Valley and Stonecutter's Island to the west, a mountain range, including Tate's Cairn and Lion Rock to the north, and Victoria Harbour to the south. Also, there are many islands scattered around Kowloon, like CAF island.

Administration

Kowloon comprises the following districts: 
Kowloon City
Kwun Tong
Sham Shui Po
Wong Tai Sin
Yau Tsim Mong

Name
The name 'Kowloon' alludes to eight mountains and a Chinese emperor: Kowloon Peak, Tung Shan, Tate's Cairn, Temple Hill, Unicorn Ridge, Lion Rock, Beacon Hill, Crow's Nest and Emperor Bing of Song. It was also spelt 'Kawloong' in some 19th century sources.

History

The part of Kowloon south of Boundary Street, together with Stonecutters Island, was ceded by Qing China to the United Kingdom under the Convention of Peking of 1860. For many years the area remained largely undeveloped, used by the British mainly for tiger-hunting expeditions.
The part of Kowloon north of Boundary Street (New Kowloon) was leased by the British as part of the New Territories under the 1898 Second Convention of Peking for 99 years. Within New Kowloon is Kowloon City, an area of Hong Kong where the Kowloon Walled City used to be located. The Kowloon Walled City itself was demolished in 1993. The same area was called Kwun Fu Cheung during the Song dynasty (9601279). "New Kowloon" has remained part of the New Territories.

Statutorily, "Kowloon" is only the area south of Boundary Street and Stonecutters Island, but in common use, New Kowloon is not regarded as part of the New Territories, but as an integral part of the Kowloon urban area whether north or south of Boundary Street.

Large-scale development of Kowloon began in the early 20th century, with the construction of the Kowloon-Canton Railway and the Kowloon Wharf, but because of the close proximity of Kowloon's built-up area to Kai Tak Airport, building construction was limited by flight paths. As a result, compared to Hong Kong Island, Kowloon had a much lower skyline. After World War II, Kowloon became extremely congested when slums for refugees from the newly established People's Republic of China gave way to public housing estates, mixed with private residential, commercial, and industrial areas.

The area of reclaimed land known as West Kowloon was once home to a dockyard for the Royal Navy.

The 1911 census recorded a population of 7,306, with most being Hakka. The invasion of China by Japan in 1937 caused the population of Kowloon to grow drastically. Between 1937 and 1939, 750,000 refugees arrived in Kowloon and nearby areas, with many not having residence.

Demographics
, 2,108,419 people lived in Kowloon.

About 94.2% of Kowloon's residents are of  ethnicity. The largest ethnic minority groups are Indonesians (1.8%), Filipinos (1.5%), Indians (0.5%), Nepalese (0.4%), and British (0.3%). Around 86% of Kowloon's residents use Cantonese as their usual language, while 2.3% use English and 1.2% use Mandarin.

Localities
Kowloon comprises these localities of Hong Kong:

Anderson Road area
Austin
Cha Kwo Ling
Cheung Sha Wan
Diamond Hill
Jordan
Hammer Hill
Hung Hom
Ho Man Tin
Kai Tak
Kowloon Bay
Kowloon City
Kowloon Tong
Kwun Tong
Lai Chi Kok
Lam Tin
Lei Yue Mun
Ma Tau Wai
Mong Kok
Ngau Chi Wan
Ngau Tau Kok
Prince Edward
San Po Kong
Sau Mau Ping
Sham Shui Po
Shek Kip Mei
Tai Kok Tsui
To Kwa Wan
Tsim Sha Tsui
Tsz Wan Shan
West Kowloon
Wong Tai Sin
Yau Ma Tei
Yau Tong

Education

Lists of primary and secondary schools in Kowloon by district:
 List of schools in Kowloon City District
 List of schools in Kwun Tong District
 List of schools in Sham Shui Po District
 List of schools in Wong Tai Sin District
 List of schools in Yau Tsim Mong District

Tertiary education
 City University of Hong Kong
 Hong Kong Polytechnic University
 Hong Kong Baptist University
 Open University of Hong Kong
 Tung Wah College
 Hong Kong Nang Yan College of Higher Education
 Gratia Christian College

Notable people
 

 Sean Parry (born 1987), cricketer

Transport 

Kowloon is connected to Hong Kong Island by two road-only tunnels (the Cross-Harbour Tunnel and the Western Harbour Crossing), three MTR railway tunnels (Tsuen Wan line, Tung Chung line/Airport Express and East Rail) and one combined road and MTR rail link tunnel (Eastern Harbour Tunnel, containing the Tseung Kwan O line and road traffic in separate parallel conduits). No bridges connect the island and Kowloon.

Gallery

References

External links

 
Cities in Asia
Populated coastal places in Hong Kong
Populated places in Hong Kong